The Upper Sûre Lake is a large reservoir in north-western Luxembourg.  It is the largest body of water in the country.  It gives its name to the commune of Lac de la Haute-Sûre, which was formed in 1979.

History
It was created by the Esch-sur-Sûre Dam which was built in the 1950s to meet Luxembourg's drinking water and electricity needs. The town of Esch-sur-Sûre/Esch-Sauer nestles at one end of the lake. Immediately above it, the river has been dammed to form a hydroelectric reservoir extending some  up the valley.

Protected area
The region around the reservoir forms the Upper Sûre Natural Park, a Luxembourgish national park. The valley of the Upper Sûre surrounding the reservoir has been designated as a Ramsar site, in Luxembourg and in neighboring Belgium, since 2004.

Recreation
Surrounded by luxuriant vegetation and peaceful creeks, the lake is a center for water sports, such as sailing, canoeing, and kayaking. Such outdoor activities, which make it an attractive spot for tourists, has led to the growth of a local crafts industry.  The lake has a very high level of water quality.

References

External links
 
 

Lakes of the Ardennes (Luxembourg)
Lakes of Luxembourg
Wiltz (canton)
Lac de la Haute-Sûre
Reservoirs in Europe
Ramsar sites in Belgium
Ramsar sites in Luxembourg